NazcarNation was a music project founded by Chris Wargo and Craig Robert Smith at Los Angeles in 2008. NazcarNation began working on song ideas and concepts in Wargo's studio apartment, creating a musical blend of hip hop and dubstep from Wargo's influence mixed with the melodic ambient leanings of Smith. Later the group tracked the louder bits with drummer/multi-instrumentalist Mark Balane, completing the framework for their live set. Known in the chillwave movement and with the completion of their debut EP titled "Dynazty" in 2010 (Mastered by Nic Pope at Different Fur Studios, San Francisco) NazcarNation crowd-tested their sample heavy grooves to packed venues in Los Angeles such as The Standard in Hollywood, The Viper Room, and SPACE15TWENTY. NazcarNation later became Gangplans.

Discography 
 Dynazty EP - 2010
 Dynazty Dynazty: The Remixes - 2010

References 

 "Quick Hits: NazcarNation". PastaPrima blog. October 4, 2010.
  "NazcarNation - Dynazty EP". TweakingTrays blog. October 10 2010.
 "Album Review: Dynazty EP". RockInsider.com. November 7, 2010.
 
 "NazcarNation Beeswax (Star Slinger remix)". Daily Beatz. January 1, 2011.
 NazcarNation. Pigeon Post. November 5, 2010.
 "NazcarNation - Beeswax - Here's some. The Record Stack blog. October 12, 2010.
 "NazcarNation". Interview on Audio Splash. November 15, 2010.

External links
 Official website
 on Myspace
 on Last.fm
 on Facebook

Musical groups from Los Angeles